Randha  is one of the significant village in the Kanisi Tehsil of Ganjam district in the Indian State of Odisha.  The Pincode of Randha is 761008. The village is 31.2 km from its district main sub-division Chatrapur and is 180 km from its State capital Bhubaneswar . Randha is a suburb of the city Berhampur and is only 6 km away.

Geography
Some of the villages around Randha with distance are Chikarada (3.2 km), Panchama (2 km), Kanisi (2 km),  Golanthara(2.2 km), Jugudi (5.2 km).

Occupations 
Many residents commute to nearby Berhampur for work. There are many businessman and farmers in Randha. Agriculture is the mainstay of the economy in the village. Randha is a market hub for nearby villages, especially for fresh vegetables and grosory.

Temples & Festivals 
Most people in the village are Hindus. Randha is a hub of temples.  A number of temples are established in the village out of which Mukteswar Temple is very prominent. The brightening  of those temples often occurs in the festivals like Maha Shivratri, Diwali and the decorated stalls during Dushera. Ganesh Puja is celebrated. Regional festivals are Jhami yatra, Makar Sankranti, Danda Yatra & meru, Rath yatra (Sri Jagannath Yatra).

Thakurani Yatra 
Maa budhi Thakurani, popularly known as 'Thakurani Yatra' is an annual festival in the village. Maa budhi Thakurani goddess is brought in the form of flower to a temporarily constructed temple. The flower comes automatically from the head of maa budhi thakurani, and to observe this event people gather at the temple.

During the Yatra, many theatre acts, musical melodies are organised in Randha, and family gatherings are common. On the last day of Yatra, Maa budhi Thakurani is again sent back to a permanent temple which is located in village itself. According to old beliefs the flower again travels back to the temple, and to avoid being cursed the villagers should not see this.  Randha yatra committee decides the date of the yatra.

Visiting places 

Some places to visit near the village are:
Gopalpur-on-sea
Silk city Berhampur
Tara Tarini temple
Siddha_Vairabi_Temple
 Ishaneswar temple 
Panchama Ganesh temple
IRE Port
Sonapur beach
 Ghatakeswar temple

Education 
In Randha are a number of colleges, sanklp daybording school, kit coaching centres and other educational institutions, including the Primary high school (Randha) and Saraswati sisu vidya mandir.  Nearby are Kanisi high school and Takshila.

Near Randha the Indian institute of science education and research (IISER Berhampur), National institute of science & Technology (NIST), Khallikote University, Gandhi Institute of Industrial Technology, and the Roland Institute of Technology are there.

Banks 
The state bank of india, uco bank, bank of india(RGB) is in konisi
.

References 

Villages in Ganjam district